Malampuzha Dam is the second largest dam and reservoirs in Kerala, located near Palakkad, in the state of Kerala in South India, built post independence by the then Madras state. Situated in the scenic hills of the Western Ghats in the background it is a combination of a masonry dam with a length of 1,849 metres and an  earthen dam with a length of 220 metres making it the longest dam in the state. The dam is 355 feet high and crosses  the Malampuzha River, a tributary of Bharathappuzha, Kerala's second longest river.  There is a network of two canal systems that serve the dam's reservoir of 42,090 hectares.

Construction
The dam project was begun in  1949 and completed in 1955. foundation stone for the project was laid on 27 March 1949, by the then Public Works Minister of Madras State, Sri M. Bhaktavatsalam as Palakkad was a part of the Madras Presidency during those times. The dam was constructed in record time, and on 9 October 1955, the then Chief Minister of Madras State, Thiru. K Kamaraj, inaugurated the dam. The total catchment area is 145 square kilometres, while the reservoir has a capacity of 8000 cubic meters of water. The  canal systems serve to irrigate farmland while the reservoir provides drinking water to Paladin and surrounding villages. The dam was constructed by the Madras government but upon the Creation of linguistically reorganized states, The Malabar District encompassing the Dam became a part of the Kerala State.

Location 
15 km from Palakkad city, North Kerala.
Attractions: Dam, amusement park, boating facilities, rock garden and ropeway.

Around the reservoir of the dam are gardens and amusement parks. Boating facilities are available on the lake.

Getting there

Nearest railway station: Palakkad Junction - 14 km 

Nearest airport: Coimbatore, 55 km from Malampuzha Dam

Main Attractions

 Entrance Garden
 Yakshi Garden
 Yakshi Statue
 Japanese Garden
 Upper Garden and viewpoint
 Cable car ride
 Fish shaped aquarium
 Toy train for kids
 Fantasy Park 
 Spiced fruits camp
 Trekking tracks
 River baths

Picture gallery

See also
List of dams and reservoirs in India
Kuttippuram bridge

References

External links

Malampuzha - Mountain River
Prawn harvest 2006–2007
Record water storage  in Malayalam dam in 2006
Statewise and riverwise distribution of large dams
Kerala Attractions

Dams in Kerala
Buildings and structures in Palakkad district
Reservoirs in Kerala
Amusement parks in Kerala
Dams completed in 1949
1949 establishments in India
Bharathappuzha
Sculpture gardens, trails and parks in India
20th-century architecture in India